Killing It is an American comedy television series starring Craig Robinson. The pilot episode premiered on Peacock on March 31, 2022, while the rest of the season premiered on April 14. In June 2022, the series was renewed for a second season.

Premise 
An underdog pursuing the American dream decides to enter the Florida Python Challenge.

Cast

Main
 Craig Robinson as Craig Foster
 Claudia O'Doherty as Jillian Glopp
 Rell Battle as Isaiah Foster
 Scott MacArthur as Brock
 Stephanie Nogueras as Camille, Craig's ex-wife

Recurring
 Wyatt Walter as Corby, Brock's son
 Jet Miller as Vanessa, Craig and Camille's daughter
 Tim Heidecker as Rodney LaMonca
 Zach Grenier as Jim Gallant

Episodes

Season 1 (2022)

Reception 
On the review aggregator website Rotten Tomatoes, 89% of nine critics' reviews are positive, with an average rating of 6/10. Metacritic, which uses a weighted average, assigned the film a score of 70 out of 100, based on four critics, indicating "generally favorable reviews".

References

External links 
 Official website
 

2020s American comedy television series
2022 American television series debuts
English-language television shows
Peacock (streaming service) original programming
Television series by Universal Television